Morden-Winkler is a provincial electoral division in the Canadian province of Manitoba. It was created by redistribution in 2008 and was created out of part of Pembina.

The riding includes the cities of Winkler and Morden. The riding's population in 2006 was 19,505. As of 2018, the riding's population is estimated to be around 25,000.

List of provincial representatives

Electoral results

2011 general election

2016 general election

2019 general election

References

Manitoba provincial electoral districts
Morden, Manitoba
Winkler, Manitoba